Shosh Atari (November 24, 1949 – April 1, 2008) was an Israeli actress, television presenter and radio personality, born in Rehovot. She was the sister of Gali Atari and Yona Atari.

Biography
In the 1970s Atari joined Kol Yisrael and in the 1980s she was one of the stars of Reshet Gimel, where she was the host of the music hit programs - "Chadash, Chadish, U-mechudash", "Lohet", and other programs edited by Tony Fine. Atari was also famous as the host of the popular TV game - Pitsuchim of the Israeli Educational Television channel. A few years ago, Atari had a kidney transplant operation after having a kidney disease. After the transplant she went to Reshet Gimel but got back to broadcasting a daily show in Radio Lev Hamedina. In 2007, Atari returned to television as a star of Hakol Dvash, a dramedy on Channel 2.

Death
Atari died of a heart attack at her home on April 1, 2008. She was discovered by her two sisters.  She was 58 years old, and buried at the Yarkon Cemetery.

References

External links

1949 births
2008 deaths
People from Rehovot
Israeli people of Yemeni-Jewish descent
Israeli television actresses
Israeli television presenters
Israeli women television presenters
Israeli radio presenters
Israeli women radio presenters
Burials at Yarkon Cemetery